Eris is a genus of the spider family Salticidae (jumping spiders). It is native to North and South America. As is typical for salticids, they are not defensive. While larger specimens could potentially bite, an envenomation would pose no danger to a human.

Name
The genus name is derived from Eris, the Greek goddess of discord (known as Discordia in Roman mythology).

Species

 Eris bulbosa (Karsch, 1880) – Mexico
 Eris flava (Peckham & Peckham, 1888) – United States to Hispaniola
 Eris floridana (Banks, 1904) – USA
 Eris illustris C. L. Koch, 1846 – Puerto Rico
 Eris limbata – United States
 Eris militaris (Hentz, 1845) – USA, Canada, Alaska
 Eris perpacta (Chickering, 1946) – Panama
 Eris perpolita (Chickering, 1946) – Panama
 Eris riedeli (Schmidt, 1971) – Ecuador or Colombia
 Eris rufa (C. L. Koch, 1846) – USA
 Eris tricolor (C. L. Koch, 1846) – Mexico
 Eris trimaculata (Banks, 1898) – Mexico
 Eris valida (Chickering, 1946) – Panama

Further reading
  (1978): The behavior of Eris marginata (Araneae: Salticidae). Peckhamia 1(4): 63-70. PDF (is now E. militaris)

External links

 Jumping Spider Eris sp. free photographs
 Pictures of E. floridana
 Pictures of E. pinea (now E. rufa)

Salticidae
Salticidae genera
Spiders of North America
Spiders of Central America
Spiders of South America